The Toptani family was the leading Albanian noble family in central Ottoman Albania at the beginning of the 20th century. The Toptani family belonged to a small number of noble families appointed by the Ottomans who used local chieftains to control Ottoman Albania more easily. Essad Pasha Toptani, the head of the family at the beginning of the 20th century, claimed that the family descended from the Thopia family. According to some sources, the name is derived from the word top, which means cannon, as the family owned a cannon at a time when artillery was rare.

Estates 
The Toptani family initially lived in Krujë before moving to Tirana during the 17th century, when many sipahis moved from rural regions of the Ottoman Empire to cities. Their move from Krujë to Tirana probably contributed to the development of sharecropping in Albania. 

The Toptani family possessed around 50,000 hectares near Tirana and Durrës and remained one of the main landowners until the end of the Second World War. The 19th century house of the Toptani family situated in the center of Tirana was turned into a museum.

Notable members 
Notable members of the family include:
 Abdi Toptani
 Blendi Fevziu
 Essad Pasha Toptani
 Fuat Toptani
 Gani Toptani
 Murad Toptani
 Sadije Toptani, Queen Mother of the Albanians

References

External links 
 Toptani family website

 
People from Tirana
Families from the Ottoman Empire